Jean José Razafimandimby (born 27 December 1989 in Antananarivo) is a Malagasy footballer who played at 2012 Africa Cup of Nations qualification.

References

External links
 

Malagasy footballers
Madagascar international footballers
Association football midfielders
Living people
1989 births
People from Antananarivo
21st-century Malagasy people